Lê Văn Triết (born 6 June 1930) is a Vietnamese diplomat who served as Minister of Trade and Tourism of the Socialist Republic of Vietnam from 1991 to 1992 and Minister of Trade of the Socialist Republic of Vietnam from 1992 to 1997.

He, along with Vietnamese Prime Minister Võ Văn Kiệt, helped realize the economic implementation of Đổi Mới, which became a major initiative to modernize Vietnam decades after the Vietnam War. It was this initiative, along with Vietnam War veterans that ultimately led U.S. President Bill Clinton to lift the U.S. embargo against Vietnam in 1994, with formal diplomatic relations taking place in 1995. Lê Văn Triết was instrumental in reintroducing Vietnam to the rest of the global economy after years of relative isolation as a result of the Vietnam War.

Background 
Lê Văn Triết was born into a peasant family in Tiền Giang, a province in Southern Vietnam on 6 June 1930. He retired from active politics in 1 January 1999, but is still supportive in local Vietnamese politics. Lê Văn Triết lives with his wife, Nguyen Thi Ly of more than 60 years in Ho Chi Minh City, Vietnam. They have three adult children.

Political career 
On October 5, 1995,  Lê Văn Triết gave a speech in Washington, D.C. discussing and answering questions about the recent normalization of U.S.-Vietnam relations. Vietnam was shifting, as he pointed out in the speech, "...from a centrally planned economy to a market-oriented economy under state management."

He was the Cabinet Minister of Trade during the 9th Government of the Socialist Republic of Vietnam from 1992 to 1997 under Prime Minister Võ Văn Kiệt.

Lê Văn Triết was given the task of negotiating on behalf of Vietnam to the rest of the world that the socialist country was open for foreign direct investments. He was the lead negotiator that ultimately led to the Socialist Republic of Vietnam being accepted into the ASEAN Economic Cooperation. The ultimate success of this mission culminated in Vietnam's acceptance into the World Trade Organization after 11 years of back and forth negotiations between Vietnam and WTO members.

Even though the U.S. embargo against Vietnam was lifted in 1994, it took nearly 11 years of negotiations with the Reagan, Bush, and Clinton Administrations before Vietnam was fully accepted into the world economy.

References 

Vietnamese diplomats
Government ministers of Vietnam
1930 births
Living people
Alternates of the 5th Central Committee of the Communist Party of Vietnam
Members of the 6th Central Committee of the Communist Party of Vietnam
Members of the 7th Central Committee of the Communist Party of Vietnam